Vasco Martins de Melo (-1388) was a Portuguese noblemen, Lord of Castanheira. He served as Alcaide-mor of Évora.

He was the son of Martim Afonso de Melo, 4th Lord of Melo, and Marinha Vasques de Albergaria, and grandson of Afonso Mendes de Melo. He was married to Teresa Correia daughter of Gonçalo Gomes de Azevedo. His second wife was Maria Afonso de Brito daughter of Martim Afonso de Brito and Isabel Afonso.

References 

1310s births
1388 deaths
14th-century Portuguese people
Portuguese nobility
Portuguese Roman Catholics